The 2005 Premier League speedway season was the second division of speedway in the United Kingdom and governed by the Speedway Control Board (SCB), in conjunction with the British Speedway Promoters' Association (BSPA).

Season summary
The League consisted of 15 teams for the 2005 season.

Two fixtures, Hull Vikings v Glasgow Tigers and Hull Vikings v King's Lynn Stars, were not ridden due to Hull being evicted from their track.

The League was run on a standard format with no play-offs and was won by the Rye House Rockets.

Final table

Premier League Knockout Cup
The 2005 Premier League Knockout Cup was the 38th edition of the Knockout Cup for tier two teams. King's Lynn Stars were the winners of the competition.

First round

Quarter-finals

Semi-finals

Final
First leg

Second leg

King's Lynn were declared Knockout Cup Champions, winning on aggregate 97–83.

Final leading averages

Riders & final averages
Berwick

Adrian Rymel 8.36 
Michal Makovský 7.83
Adam Pietraszko 7.35
Scott Smith 7.07
Tom P. Madsen 7.02
Carl Wilkinson 7.01
Piotr Dym 6.64
Chris Schramm 5.98
Joachim Kugelmann 5.42
Simon Cartwright 4.83

Edinburgh

Russell Harrison 8.33
Theo Pijper 8.11 
Ross Brady 8.09
Daniel Nermark 8.06 
Matthew Wethers 7.29
David McAllan 6.32
Cameron Woodward 6.28
William Lawson 5.45
Kristian Lund 4.12
Robert Ksiezak 3.27

Exeter

Mark Lemon 8.73
Ray Morton 8.17
Seemond Stephens 7.20
Sebastien Trésarrieu 7.09
Antonín Šváb Jr. 7.08
Lee Smethills 6.18
Pavel Ondrašík 5.77
Ben Barker 3.89
Nick Simmons 3.24

Glasgow

Shane Parker 9.74
George Štancl 8.66 
Stefan Ekberg 8.29
Claus Kristensen 5.91
Trent Leverington 5.83
Paul Bentley 5.67
James Birkinshaw 4.95
James Cockle 4.76
Matthew Wethers 4.63
Adam Roynon 2.94

Hull

Garry Stead 8.05
Paul Thorp 8.00
Emiliano Sanchez 7.89
Emil Kramer 7.35
Craig Branney 5.05
Lee Dicken 4.88
Daniel Giffard 4.83
Simone Terenzani 4.64
Joel Parsons 4.45

Isle of Wight

Craig Boyce 9.81
Ulrich Østergaard 8.19
Krzysztof Stojanowski 7.45 
Krister Marsh 6.44
Steen Jensen 6.29
Jason Doyle 5.83
Glen Phillips 5.24
Tomáš Suchánek 4.78
Manuel Hauzinger 3.41

King's Lynn

Tomáš Topinka 9.93 
Oliver Allen 9.03
Kevin Doolan 7.78 
Troy Batchelor 7.49
Adam Allott 7.04
Paul Lee 6.43
Ashley Jones 5.25
Jan Jaroš 4.91
James Brundle 4.75
Tommy Stange 3.85
Darren Mallett 3.56

Newcastle

James Grieves 8.78 
Josef Franc 7.95
Phil Morris 6.69
Richard Juul 5.84
Claus Kristensen 5.28
Christian Henry 5.09
Luboš Tomíček Jr. 4.91
Jamie Robertson 4.89
James Birkinshaw 4.26
Kristian Lund 4.20

Newport

Craig Watson 8.37
Mads Korneliussen 7.75
Neil Collins 7.45
Tony Atkin 6.19
Michael Coles 5.93
Kristian Lund 4.77
Henrik Vedel 4.00
Lee Dicken 3.64
Karlis Ezergailis 2.15

Reading

Matej Žagar 10.43
Danny Bird 9.38
Andrew Appleton 7.32
Zdeněk Simota 6.41
Mathieu Trésarrieu 5.60
Richard Wolff 5.52
Chris Mills 5.29
Steve Masters 3.39
Chris Johnson 2.96

Rye House

Stuart Robson 9.03 
Chris Neath 8.80 
Brent Werner 8.24 
Edward Kennett 8.02
Danny King 7.57
Tommy Allen 6.32
Steve Boxall 4.80
Luke Bowen 3.82

Sheffield

Sean Wilson 9.21 
Andre Compton 9.08 
Ricky Ashworth 7.98
Richard Hall 6.29
Ben Wilson 6.03
Kyle Legault 5.53
Trevor Harding 4.84
Paul Cooper 4.60

Somerset

Magnus Zetterström 9.38
Glenn Cunningham 7.96 
Paul Fry 7.68
Ritchie Hawkins 6.83
Jason King 5.04
Jamie Smith 5.03
Chris Mills 4.48
Simon Walker 2.44
Lee Smart 2.23

Stoke

Alan Mogridge 8.06
Robbie Kessler 7.86
Peter Carr 5.86
Paul Clews 5.40
Adam Allott 5.22
Barrie Evans 4.55
Luke Priest 3.67
Rob Grant Jr. 3.04
Jack Hargreaves 2.81

Workington

Carl Stonehewer 9.89 
James Wright 7.51
Kauko Nieminen 7.33 
Tomasz Piszcz 7.10
Shaun Tacey 7.04
Scott Robson 6.13
Kevin Little 5.90
Jamie Courtney 4.54
Aidan Collins .4.19
Scott James 2.2

See also
List of United Kingdom Speedway League Champions
Knockout Cup (speedway)

References

Speedway Premier League
2005 in speedway
2005 in British motorsport